The 1955 Titleholders Championship was contested from March 10–13 at Augusta Country Club. It was the 16th edition of the Titleholders Championship.

This event was won by Patty Berg.

Final leaderboard

External links
Daytona Beach Morning Journal source

Titleholders Championship
Golf in Georgia (U.S. state)
Titleholders Championship
Titleholders Championship
Titleholders Championship
Titleholders Championship
Women's sports in Georgia (U.S. state)